18 is a collaborative studio album by guitarist Jeff Beck and actor, producer and musician Johnny Depp. Released on 15 July 2022 on Rhino Records, it is Beck's final studio album released before his death in January 2023.

The 13-track collection features two Depp-penned originals and a selection of cover songs by Killing Joke, the Beach Boys, Marvin Gaye, the Miracles, the Velvet Underground, the Everly Brothers and Janis Ian. Upon release, the album received mixed reviews from music critics.

Background and release 
Beck and Depp first met in 2016 and quickly got along very well, forming a close friendship. According to Beck, he found a "kindred spirit" in Depp and the two bonded over "cars and guitars and spent most of their time together trying to make each other laugh". Beck was convinced they should record music together and began to do so in 2019. Beck and Depp felt that them playing together "ignited their youthful spirit and creativity" and according to Beck, both of them would joke about how they felt 18 again, hence their decision for the album title. Depp added: "It's an extraordinary honour to play and write music with Jeff, one of the true greats and someone I am now privileged enough to call my brother." In September 2019, Depp joined Beck on stage for some concerts of the latter's US tour and they performed the song "Isolation" live for the first time.

"Isolation" would later be officially released, as Beck and Depp's debut single, on 16 April 2020. Beck said in a statement that the decision to release this song early, before finishing the album, was made due to the fact that many people were still self-quarantining amid the COVID-19 pandemic. Beck stated: "We weren’t expecting to release it so soon, but given all the hard days and true 'isolation' that people are going through in these challenging times, we decided now might be the right time to let you all hear it."

On 29 May 2022, Depp, who was still awaiting a verdict in his highly publicised defamation trial against ex-wife Amber Heard, made a surprise appearance at a Jeff Beck gig in Sheffield, playing guitar along with Beck to three classic songs from Lennon, Gaye and Hendrix. Depp joined Beck for the rest of the shows in the U.K. and Europe during June and July.

On 9 June 2022, the duo released the first official single from the album, the song "This Is a Song for Miss Hedy Lamarr", which has been described as an ode to Austrian-American actress and inventor Hedy Lamarr. Ten days later, on 19 June 2022, another cover from the album was released, this time a cover of the Velvet Underground's "Venus in Furs", followed shortly by an instrumental cover of the Beach Boys' "Caroline, No" on 24 June. The last song to be released before the album's release was a cover of Killing Joke's "The Death and Resurrection Show", on 7 July 2022.

On October 5, 2022, Depp joined Beck for a joint American tour which kicked off in Washington D.C. and ended in early November.

Songs

Critical reception 

18 received generally mixed reviews from music critics At Metacritic, which assigns a normalised rating out of 100 to reviews from mainstream publications, the album received an average score of 47, based on 8 reviews, indicating "mixed or average reviews".

In a positive review, Doug Collette of Glide magazine wrote that the duo's alliance on 18 benefits both men creatively and otherwise. Collette found that, whilst this project has given Depp the chance to progress as a musician and vocalist, "he sounds like any fledgling musician still in the process of finding his own style."

Neil McCormick of The Independent felt that 18, showcases Beck's playing, who, according to McCormick, hadn't played so well in decades. He wrote that Depp is back doing what he loves, singing and playing the guitar, and in doing so, he "conjures a crunchy lyrical psychodrama about the high price of fame."

Track listing

Personnel

Musicians
Jeff Beck – lead guitar (all tracks), rhythm guitar (tracks 8, 9, 13), acoustic guitar (track 5), bass (tracks 3, 8), drums (track 8), producer
Johnny Depp – lead vocal (tracks 2, 3, 4, 6, 8, 9, 10, 11, 12, 13), backing vocals (track 8), rhythm guitar (tracks 2, 4, 6, 10, 13), acoustic guitar (tracks 6, 10, 12), baritone guitar (track 11), bass (tracks 1, 2, 4, 6, 10, 11, 12), drums (tracks 6, 10), percussion (track 9), keyboards (track 4), producer

Additional musicians
Vinnie Colaiuta – drums (tracks 2, 3, 4, 9, 11, 12, 13)
Rhonda Smith – bass (tracks 7, 13)
Pino Palladino – bass (track 9)
Robert Adam Stevenson – keyboards (tracks 1, 3, 9, 11, 12), piano (tracks 11, 12), strings (tracks 1, 9, 11, 12)
Tommy Henriksen – keyboards and strings (track 6)
Ben Thomas – keyboards (track 3)
James Pearson – keyboards (track 7)
Jason Rebello – piano (track 3)
Vanessa Freebairn-Smith – cello (track 1)
Olivia Safe – vocals (track 5)

Additional personnel
Barry Grint – mastering
Shon Hartman – product manager
Mike Engstrom - project manager
Allison Boron, Hugh Gilmour, Jason Etzy, Kent Liu, Kevin Gore, Lisa Gilnes, Matthew Taoatao, Paul Bromby, Rachel Gutek, Sheryl Farber, Susanne Savage - project manager assistants 
Colin Newman – project manager supervisor
Sandra Beck – album cover

Charts

References 

2022 albums
Jeff Beck albums
Rhino Records albums
Works by Johnny Depp